Wheelchair basketball has been contested at the Summer Paralympic Games since the 1960 Summer Paralympics in Rome.

Winning the Paralympics is considered to be the highest honor in international wheelchair basketball, followed by the World Championships of the International Wheelchair Basketball Federation (IWBF) for men and women and the respective intercontinental championships.

Events 
In the first two Paralympic games, there were two men's events (Class A and B). Since the Paralympic games of 1968, there are two events, a men's event and a women's event.

Current events
Men's team
Women's team

Medalists 
Medal winning athletes for every Summer Games since 1960 are as follows:

Men's team 
Class A

Class B

Men's team

Women's team

Medal table

See also
Basketball at the Summer Olympics
Basketball ID at the Summer Paralympics

References

IPC Historical Results Database - General Search, International Paralympic Committee (IPC)
The information from the International Paralympic Committee (IPC) website is based on sources which does not present all information from earlier Paralympic Games (1960-1984), such as relay and team members. (Per 17 April 2011)
Paralympics - Results, International Wheelchair Basketball Federation (IWBF)
World History of Wheelchair Basketball, British Wheelchair Basketball

 
Paralympics
Wheelchair basketball competitions between national teams
Sports at the Summer Paralympics